Carl-Heinz Greve (17 October 1920 – 21 May 1998) was a German general in the Bundeswehr. During World War II, he served in the Luftwaffe and was a recipient of the Knight's Cross of the Iron Cross of Nazi Germany.

Awards and decorations

 Knight's Cross of the Iron Cross on 7 October 1942 as Leutnant and pilot in the 3./Kampfgruppe 606
 Order of Merit of the Federal Republic of Germany
 Merit Cross 1st Class (15 May 1973)
 Great Cross of Merit (30 November 1974)

References

 

1920 births
1998 deaths
Luftwaffe pilots
German World War II pilots
Bundeswehr generals
Lieutenant generals of the German Air Force
Recipients of the Gold German Cross
Recipients of the Knight's Cross of the Iron Cross
Commanders Crosses of the Order of Merit of the Federal Republic of Germany
German prisoners of war in World War II
People from the Province of Westphalia
Military personnel from Münster